Subject (also known as Subject...Aldo Nova, and Subject.....Aldo Nova) is the second studio album by Canadian rock musician Aldo Nova, released in 1983. It was certified Gold by the RIAA on December 5, 1994.

Track listing 
All songs written by Aldo Nova except where noted.

Side One
"Subject's Theme" – 1:36
"Armageddon (Race Cars)" – 0:25
"Armageddon" – 2:41
"Monkey on Your Back" – 4:35
"Hey Operator" (Carl Dixon) – 3:54
"Cry Baby Cry" – 4:17
"Victim of a Broken Heart" (Tony Bruno, Nova) – 4:19

Side Two
"Africa (Primal Love)" – 0:39
"Hold Back the Night" (Dwight Druick, Nova) – 4:48
"Always Be Mine" – 4:11
"All Night Long" – 3:41
"War Suite" – 1:26
"Prelude to Paradise" – 1:31
"Paradise" – 3:17

Personnel 

 Aldo Nova - vocals, guitar, bass, keyboards
 David Sikes - bass
 Steve Buslowe - bass
 Kevin Carlson - second guitar
 Neil Jason - bass
 Chuck Burgi - drums
 Bill Carmassi - drums
 Denis Chartrand - acoustic piano, string arrangement

References

Aldo Nova albums
1983 albums
Concept albums
Albums produced by Aldo Nova
Portrait Records albums